Baek Ji-young is a South Korean K-pop singer. Her discography consists of eight studio albums, six compilation albums, two video albums, two extended plays, thirty-four singles (including two as a featured artist), and fifteen soundtrack appearances.

Albums

Studio albums

Compilation albums

Extended plays

Singles

As lead artist

As featured artist

Other charted songs

Soundtrack appearances

Videography

Video albums

Music videos

References

Discographies of South Korean artists
K-pop discographies